The 81st season of the Campeonato Gaúcho kicked off on January 6, 2001 and ended on June 3, 2001. Seventeen teams participated. Grêmio beat Juventude in the finals and won their 33rd title. Avenida and Novo Hamburgo were relegated.

Participating teams

System 
The championship would have three stages:

 First phase: The thirteen teams that didn't participate in the Série A or the Série B played against each other in a single round-robin system. After 13 rounds, the four best teams qualified to the Second phase.
 Second phase: The four remaining teams joined the teams that participated in the Série A or Série B (Internacional, Grêmio, Caxias and Juventude), and played against each other twice, with the winners of each half qualifying to the Finals. The four best teams qualified to the following year's Copa Sul-Minas.
 Finals: The stage winners of the Second phase played in two matches to define the Champions.

Championship

First phase

First round

Second round

Final standings

Finals

References 

Campeonato Gaúcho seasons
Gaúcho